Ance (Gascon: Ansa) is a former commune in the Pyrénées-Atlantiques department in Nouvelle-Aquitaine in southwestern France. On 1 January 2017, it was merged into the new commune Ance Féas.

See also
Communes of the Pyrénées-Atlantiques department

References

Former communes of Pyrénées-Atlantiques